Bang Sue is a khwaeng (subdistrict) of Bang Sue District, in Bangkok, Thailand. In 2020, it had a total population of 79,405 people.

History
In the early Rattanakosin era corresponds to the King Rama I's reign, Nguyễn Ánh who escaped to live in Bangkok had escaped again. Therefore, relatives who traveled from Laos came to look for them. The king therefore decided that these two Annamese families should settle and live in a place far from the sea so that they would not escape again, that was Bang Sue.

Bang Sue, also colloquially known as "Bang Pho" (บางโพ), what is now four-way intersection, where Pracharat Sai 1 cuts across Pracharat Sai 2 Roads near Wat Bang Pho Omawa, an eponymous. It is also the name of surrounding area.

Bang Pho was mentioned in Nirat Phu Khao Thong (นิราศภูเขาทอง, "journey to golden mount"), the travelogue of the poet Sunthon Phu. In the literature described the Annamese in Bang Pho have a career selling shrimp and fish. Evidence that once Annamese lived here is a Wat Anam Nikayaram, an Annamese Buddhist temple near Bang Pho Intersection today.

In 2009, the northern area was completely separated into a subdistrict, namely Wong Sawang.

Geography
Bang Sue is the southern part of the district. The west bank is all connected to the Chao Phraya River.  It borders Wong Sawang to the north (Southern Railway Line is a borderline), Chatuchak to the east (Khlong Prapa is a borderline), Thanon Nakhon Chai Si to the south (Khlong Bang Sue is a borderline), Bang O (across the Chao Phraya River) to the west.

Administration
Bang Sue consists of 24 communities.

Pop culture
Bang Sue or Bang Pho is the setting of a Thai disco song, titled 'Sao Bang Pho' (สาวบางโพ, "Bang Pho girl"). It was sung by Direk Amatayakul in the year 1982.

References

Bang Sue district
Subdistricts of Bangkok
Neighbourhoods of Bangkok